Jacques Grimbert (10 May 1929 – 17 December 2019) was a French conductor and choral conductor.

Biography 
After studying western concert flute at the Conservatoire de Lille, Grimbert integrated the Conservatoire de Paris, where Olivier Messiaen and Darius Milhaud were his teachers among others.

On 1964 Grimbert conducted the "La Faluche" students choir, during the 5th Zimriya, a jewish international choir festival in Israel.

He was the founder of the Chœur et Orchestre de Paris Sorbonne in 1975, and was the artistic director of  until 2008.

His multiple collaborations (Leonard Bernstein, Seiji Ozawa...) associated with his real desire to transmit to young artists gave rise to vocations, such as those of choral conductors Michel Laplénie, Laurence Equilbey, and Denis Rouger.

In February 2009, he was made a chevalier of the Légion d'honneur.

Grimbert died on 17 December 2019.

References

External links 
 Jacques Grimberg on Who's Who
 Discography on Discogs
 Henry Purcell : "Hither This Way","Two Shepherdesses" (from King Arthur) - Jacques Grimbert on YouTube

1929 births
2019 deaths
French choral conductors
French male conductors (music)
Conservatoire de Paris alumni
Chevaliers of the Légion d'honneur
21st-century French conductors (music)
21st-century French male musicians